Aloha is a genus of planthopper named by George Willis Kirkaldy in 1904. , ten species are recognized:
 Aloha artemisiae  — Hawai'ian Islands
 Aloha campylothecae  — Hawai'ian Islands
 Aloha dubautiae  — Hawai'ian Islands
 Aloha flavocollaris  — Hawai'ian Islands
 Aloha ipomoeae  — Hawai'ian Islands
 Aloha kirkaldyi  — Hawai'ian Islands
 Aloha lycurgus  — Marquesas Islands
 Aloha myoporicola  — Hawai'ian Islands
 Aloha plectranthi  — Hawai'ian Islands
 Aloha swezeyi  — Hawai'ian Islands

References

Further reading

 
 

Insects of Hawaii
Fauna of the Marquesas Islands
Delphacini
Taxa named by George Willis Kirkaldy
Auchenorrhyncha genera